Furunlu station is a railway station in the village of Furunlu in Bayındır, Izmir, Turkey. It consists of a single platform servicing one track. TCDD Taşımacılık operates 5 daily trains, in each direction, from Izmir to Ödemiş.

External links
TCDD Regional Trains

Railway stations in İzmir Province
Railway stations opened in 2014
2014 establishments in Turkey
Bayındır District